The Dryden Ice Dogs are a junior A ice hockey team from Dryden, Ontario, Canada.  They are a part of the Superior International Junior Hockey League.

History
At 49° 47′ North, the Ice Dogs were the most northern junior A team in Ontario until 2008, further north than the Abitibi Eskimos of the Northern Ontario Junior Hockey League.  In the 2008–09 season, the Sioux Lookout Flyers joined the league and at 50° 06′ took over as Ontario's most northerly junior hockey club until they folded in 2013.

The Ice Dogs are one of the Superior International Junior Hockey League (SIJHL)'s charter teams and has historically been one of the top teams in the league, having won the first league championship and finished towards the top of the standings in most seasons.

The Ice Dogs play at the Dryden Memorial Arena and have games broadcast on CKDR, Dryden's local radio station.

Season-by-season results

Playoffs

2002 Won League, Lost Dudley Hewitt Cup
Dryden Ice Dogs defeated Nipigon Featherman Hawks 4-games-to-none
Dryden Ice Dogs defeated Fort Frances Borderland Thunder 4-games-to-none SIJHL Champions
Rayside-Balfour Sabrecats (NOJHL) defeated Dryden Ice Dogs 2-games-to-none
2003 Lost Semi-final
Fort Frances Borderland Thunder defeated Dryden Ice Dogs 4-games-to-none
2004 Lost Final
Dryden Ice Dogs defeated Fort Frances Borderland Thunder 4-games-to-3
Fort William North Stars defeated Dryden Ice Dogs 4-games-to-1
2005 Lost Semi-final
Fort Frances Borderland Thunder defeated Dryden Ice Dogs 4-games-to-none
2006 Lost Final, Lost Dudley Hewitt Cup semi-final
Dryden Ice Dogs defeated Schreiber Diesels 4-games-to-none
Fort William North Stars defeated Dryden Ice Dogs 4-games-to-none
Third in Dudley Hewitt Cup round robin (1-2)
Sudbury Jr. Wolves (NOJHL) defeated Dryden Ice Dogs 5-4 in semi-final
2007 Lost Semi-final
Fort William North Stars defeated Dryden Ice Dogs 4-games-to-1
2008 Won League, Lost Dudley Hewitt Cup semi-final
Dryden Ice Dogs defeated Schreiber Diesels 4-games-to-3
Dryden Ice Dogs defeated Fort William North Stars 4-games-to-1 SIJHL CHAMPIONS
Third in Dudley Hewitt Cup round robin (1-2)
Newmarket Hurricanes (OPJHL) defeated Dryden Ice Dogs 2-1 OT in semi-final
2009 Lost Quarter-final
Schreiber Diesels defeated Dryden Ice Dogs 3-games-to-none
2010 Lost Final
First in round robin (4-0) vs. Fort William North Stars and Sioux Lookout Flyers
Dryden Ice Dogs defeated Fort Frances Lakers 4-games-to-2
Fort William North Stars defeated Dryden Ice Dogs 4-games-to-1
2011 Lost Final
Dryden Ice Dogs defeated Duluth Clydesdales 4-games-to-none
Dryden Ice Dogs defeated Fort Frances Lakers 4-games-to-2
Wisconsin Wilderness defeated Dryden Ice Dogs 4-games-to-none
2012 Lost Semi-final
Dryden Ice Dogs defeated Sioux Lookout Flyers 4-games-to-1
Fort Frances Lakers defeated Dryden Ice Dogs 4-games-to-none
2013 Lost Semi-finalFort Frances Lakers defeated Dryden Ice Dogs 4-games-to-3Dudley Hewitt Cup
Central Canada Jr. A ChampionshipsNOJHL – OJHL – SIJHL – Host''Round-robin play with 2nd vs. 3rd in semifinal to advance against 1st in the championship game.

References

External links
 

Superior International Junior Hockey League teams
Dryden, Ontario
Sport in Northern Ontario
Ice hockey clubs established in 2001
2001 establishments in Ontario